To Die For (also known as Dracula: The Love Story) is a 1989 American independent romantic horror film directed by Deran Sarafian and starring Brendan Hughes as vampire Vlad Tepes, Duane Jones (in his final film role), Philip Granger, Julie Maddalena and Amanda Wyss.

Plot
Vlad Tepes, the Prince of Darkness, resurfaces in Los Angeles with a new look, new life and new love. But with the new life comes an old nemesis who has waited an eternity to settle the score.

Cast
Brendan Hughes as Vlad Tepes
Sydney Walsh as Kate Wooten
Amanda Wyss as Celia Kett
Scott Jacoby as Martin Planting
Micah Grant as Mike Dunn
Duane Jones as Simon Little

Release
The film was given a limited release theatrically in the United States by Skouras Pictures in 1989.

The film was released on VHS by Academy Entertainment in the late 1980s.  The film was released on DVD in the United States under the title Bram Stoker's To Die For by Triumph Marketing in 2005.  This version is currently out of print.

Sequel
The film was followed by the sequel Son of Darkness: To Die For II in 1991.

References

External links

1989 films
1989 horror films
1989 independent films
American independent films
Dracula films
Films scored by Cliff Eidelman
Films set in Los Angeles
Films directed by Deran Sarafian
Cultural depictions of Vlad the Impaler
1980s English-language films
1980s American films